This is a list of Olympic medalists in rugby sevens.

Current Program

Men's

Women's

Discontinued event
This is a list of Olympic medalists in rugby union.

Medal table
Includes medals from rugby union (1900-1924) and rugby sevens (2016-2020).

References

Rugby
medalists
Olympic medalists

Olympics